Gastrallus is a genus of beetles in the family Ptinidae. They are distributed nearly worldwide except Australia and Central and South America; almost half are native to the Palearctic realm.

Currently, almost 100 species are scientifically described:

Gastrallus immarginatus group:
Gastrallus abbreviatus Zahradník, 2009 – recorded from Thailand
Gastrallus assamensis Zahradník, 2009 – recorded from India
Gastrallus cymoreki Español, 1990 – recorded from Nepal
Gastrallus immarginatus P. W. J. Müller, 1821 – recorded from Armenia, Austria, Belgium, Bulgaria, China, Croatia, Czech Republic, Denmark, France, Great Britain, Germany, Greece, Hungary, Italy, Poland, Russia, Slovakia, Spain, Sweden, Switzerland, Ukraine, Tunisia; also on Sri Lanka?
Gastrallus ornatulus Toskina, 2003 – recorded from Azerbaijan and Southern Russia
Gastrallus tuberculatus Pic, 1914 – recorded from Taiwan, Laos, Vietnam and the Palaearctic realm
Gastrallus wittmeri Español, 1977 – recorded from Bhutan and Nepal

Gastrallus laevigatus group:
Gastrallus abyssinicus Español, 1963 – recorded from the Republic of the Congo (Brazzaville), Ethiopia and India
Gastrallus affinis Sakai, 1984 – recorded from Japan
Gastrallus asgardi Zahradník, 2009 – recorded from Thailand
Gastrallus birmanicus Pic, 1937 – recorded from Myanmar
Gastrallus bremeri Español, 1983 – recorded from Thailand
Gastrallus brunneus Zahradník, 2009 – recorded from Thailand
Gastrallus chantaburensis Zahradník, 2009 – recorded from Thailand
Gastrallus chiangmaiensis Zahradník, 2009 – recorded from Thailand
Gastrallus clematorum Fursov in Sinadskiy, 1958 – recorded from Uzbekistan
Gastrallus corsicus Schilsky, 1898 – recorded from Algeria, Croatia, France, Greece, Israel, Italy, Morocco, Portugal, Spain, Syria
Gastrallus cucullatus Lesne, 1902 – recorded from Sri Lanka
Gastrallus dimidiatus Sakai, 1984 – recorded from Japan
Gastrallus erdosi Toskina, 2003 – recorded from Israel
Gastrallus haucki Zahradník, 2009 – recorded from India
Gastrallus havai Zahradník, 2009 – recorded from Thailand
Gastrallus horaki Zahradník, 2009 – recorded from Thailand
Gastrallus indicus Reitter, 1913 – Indian bookworm beetle – recorded from Uttar Pradesh (India), Myanmar and the Palearctic realm
Gastrallus insuetus Logvinovskiy, 1978 – recorded from Kazakhstan
Gastrallus insulcatus Pic, 1937 – recorded from Uttar Pradesh (India)
Gastrallus jendeki Zahradník, 2009 – recorded from Laos
Gastrallus jurciceki Zahradník, 2009 – recorded from Thailand
Gastrallus kejvali Zahradník, 2009 – recorded from India
Gastrallus knizeki Zahradník, 1996 – recorded from Austria, Czech Republic, France, Germany, Slovakia
Gastrallus kocheri Español, 1963 – recorded from Greece (Crete), Italy, Morocco, Spain, Tunisia
Gastrallus laevigatus (Olivier, 1790) – recorded from Algeria, Austria, Belgium, Bosnia and Herzegovina, Bulgaria, Croatia, Cyprus, Czech Republic, France, Germany, Georgia, Greece, Hungary, Israel, Italy, Japan, Morocco, Poland, Portugal, Russia, Slovakia, Spain, Switzerland, Syria, The Netherlands, Tunisia, Turkey, Ukraine
Gastrallus laosensis Zahradník, 2009 – recorded from Laos
Gastrallus laticollis Pic, 1929 – recorded from Singapore
Gastrallus latus Zahradník, 2009 – recorded from Thailand
Gastrallus ludmilae Zahradník, 2009 – recorded from Malaysia
Gastrallus lyctoides (Wollaston, 1865) – recorded from the Canary Islands (Spain)
Gastrallus mareceki Zahradník, 2009 – recorded from Thailand
Gastrallus mauritanicus Español, 1963 – recorded from Italy, Morocco, Tunisia, Turkey
Gastrallus minor Zahradník, 2009 – recorded from Thailand
Gastrallus natalkae Zahradník, 2009 – recorded from Thailand
Gastrallus nikolkae Zahradník, 2009 – recorded from Thailand
Gastrallus pacholatkoi Zahradník, 2009 – recorded from Laos
Gastrallus parvus Zahradník, 2009 – recorded from Malaysia
Gastrallus phloeophagus Iablokoff-Khnzorian, 1960 – recorded from Armenia
Gastrallus plicaticollis Pic, 1937 – recorded from India
Gastrallus prudeki Zahradník, 2009 – recorded from Thailand
Gastrallus pubens Fairmaire, 1875 (= Gastrallus insulcatus Pic, 1937) – recorded from Azerbaijan, Chad, Egypt, Ethiopia, India, Israel, Italy, Jordan, Kenya, Lebanon, Senegal, Spain, Sudan, Syria, Tunisia, Turkmenistan and Uganda
Gastrallus pusillus Español, 1983 – recorded from Thailand
Gastrallus rolciki Zahradník, 2009 – recorded from India
Gastrallus rollei Reitter, 1912 – recorded from Spain
Gastrallus rufus Zahradník, 2009 – recorded from Thailand
Gastrallus sausai Zahradník, 2009 – recorded from Laos
Gastrallus siamensis Zahradník, 2009 – recorded from Thailand
Gastrallus subtilis Toskina, 1998 – recorded from Saudi Arabia
Gastrallus svihlai Zahradník, 2009 – recorded from Thailand
Gastrallus svobodaorum Zahradník, 2009 – recorded from Thailand
Gastrallus testaceicornis Pic, 1922 – recorded from Taiwan
Gastrallus testaceus Pic, 1936 – recorded from Malaysia
Gastrallus thailandicus Zahradník, 2009 – recorded from Thailand
Gastrallus vavrai Zahradník, 2007 – recorded from Turkey
Gastrallus vulgaris Zahradník, 2009 – recorded from Thailand 
Gastrallus whitei Zahradník, 2009 – recorded from Thailand

Unassigned to a species group:
Gastrallus alluaudi Pic, 1948 – recorded from Djibouti
Gastrallus basilewskyi Español, 1963 – recorded from the Republic of the Congo (Kinshasa) and Zimbabwe
Gastrallus bilyi Zahradník, 2008 – recorded from South Africa
Gastrallus cervelloi Viñolas, 1999 – recorded from Equatorial Guinea
Gastrallus degallieri Español, 1992 – recorded from Central African Republic
Gastrallus fasciatus White, 1976 – recorded from North America
Gastrallus flagellatus Zahradník, 2008 – recorded from Kenya
Gastrallus gabonicus Español, 1963 – recorded from Gabon
Gastrallus granulatus Zahradník, 2008 – recorded from Kenya
Gastrallus janae Zahradník, 2008 – recorded from Kenya
Gastrallus jeremiasi Viñolas & Masó, 2007 – recorded from South Africa
Gastrallus karelai Zahradník, 2008 – recorded from Kenya
Gastrallus kaszabi Español, 1966 – recorded from Ghana
Gastrallus kenyaensis Zahradník, 2008 – recorded from Kenya
Gastrallus krugerensis Viñolas & Masó, 2007 – recorded from South Africa
Gastrallus kuboni Zahradník, 2008 – recorded from Tanzania
Gastrallus makerensis Español & Viñolas, 1996 – recorded from Rwanda
Gastrallus marginipennis LeConte, 1879 – recorded from North America
Gastrallus minutus Español & Comas, 1991 – recorded from Botswana, South Africa, Tanzania
Gastrallus natalensis Zahradník, 2008 – recorded from South Africa
Gastrallus ndumuensis Viñolas & Masó, 2007 – recorded from South Africa
Gastrallus omedesae Viñolas & Masó, 2007 – recorded from South Africa
Gastrallus pafuriensis Viñolas & Masó, 2007 – recorded from South Africa
Gastrallus pruinosus (Pic, 1904) – recorded from Madagascar
Gastrallus ribesi Español, 1992 – recorded from Equatorial Guinea
Gastrallus rorkei Español & Comas, 1991 – recorded from South Africa
Gastrallus sasajii Sakai, 2007 – recorded from Japan
Gastrallus skukuzaensis Viñolas & Masó, 2007 – recorded from South Africa
Gastrallus snizeki Zahradník, 2008 – recorded from South Africa
Gastrallus strydomi Viñolas & Masó, 2007 – recorded from South Africa
Gastrallus varii Español & Comas, 1991 – recorded from South Africa, Zimbabwe
Gastrallus vinyolasi Español, 1992 – recorded from Central African Republic
Gastrallus vrydaghi Español, 1963 – recorded from Ivory Coast, Sudan, Tanzania

References

Ptinidae